Johann Ludwig Reichsgraf von Wallmoden-Gimborn (22 April 1736 in Hanover – 10 October 1811 in Hanover) was a German lieutenant-general and art collector.

Life
Wallmoden was an illegitimate son of George II of Great Britain by his mistress Amalie von Wallmoden.  She was married to Adam Gottlieb, Count Wallmoden (1704–1752), but for a payment of 1000 Ducats the Count was prepared to defer his claims on his wife to George, and was finally separated from her in 1740.

On the death of Queen Caroline in 1737, the Prime Minister, Robert Walpole, suggested that Amalie be brought over from Hanover to Britain to take her place as maîtresse en titre to George II.  In the meantime Lady Deloraine, a loquacious but not very intelligent courtesan, with whom George had a distant relationship, functioned as a stopgap.  Thus the young Johann Ludwig came to be conceived in England and grew up at St. James's Palace and Kensington Palace.  As an illegitimate son of the king, he received a comprehensive education, after which he went on a Grand Tour to Italy, where he acquired an extensive collection of classical statues, busts, and reliefs.  On his return he entered the Hanoverian army and rose to the rank of major general.

[[File:2014-06-11 KunstFestSpiele Herrenhausen, Besuch vom Freundeskreis Hannover, (137) Kunstsammlung Johann Ludwig von Wallmoden-Gimborn. Ausstellung Als die Royals aus Hannover kamen.jpg|thumb|left|Collection of Wallmoden-Gimborn in the exhibition The Hanoverians on Britain's Throne 1714-1837, in the Palace of Herrenhausen, 2014 ]]

Around the year 1700, several noblemen's country estates had been established in the former flood plain of the Leine.  In 1768 Wallmoden acquired some of these gardens and merged them into the Wallmodengarten (later to become the Georgengarten). In 1782 he built the Wallmoden-Schloss to house his collections of antiquities.  In 1782 he bought the Reichsherrschaft Gimborn in Westphalia from Prince Johann I. of Schwarzenberg, and on 17 January 1783 was raised to the nobility of the Holy Roman Empire by the emperor Joseph II, with the title Wallmoden-Gimborn and with a corresponding augmentation of his coat-of-arms to Imperial count.

Simultaneously, Wallmoden attained a seat and a voice on the Westphalian College of Imperial Counts, and therewith on the Reichsstandschaft.  After the death of count Philipp II of Schaumburg-Lippe (1723–1787), Wallmoden-Gimborn acted for his widow (princess Juliane of Hesse Philippsthal) as guardian of her younger son and heir George William (1784–1860).  From 1790 to 1811, he was an honorary member of the Prussian Academy of Arts in Berlin.

On 5 July 1803, as Oberbefehlshaber (commander-in-chief) of the Hanoverian army, he signed the convention of Artlenburg and thus capitulated before the Napoleonic troops arrived.

After Wallmoden-Gimborn's death, his nephew King George III acquired his collections of antique sculpture and books, over 8000 volumes.  The collections are still in the ownership of the Welfs and since 1979 have formed a collection of the Archeological Institute in Göttingen.

Marriages
Wallmoden-Gimborn was first married in Hanover on 18 April 1766 to Charlotte Christiane Auguste Wilhelmine von Wangenheim (1740–1783), and they had five children:
 Ernst Georg August (8 May 1767 – 1 January 1792)
 Ludwig Georg Thedel (6 February 1769 – 20 March 1862), who became an Austrian General of Cavalry
 Georgine Charlotte Auguste (1 February 1770 – 13 August 1859)
 Wilhelmine Magdalene Friederike (22 June 1772 – 15 September 1819), who in 1793 married Baron Heinrich Friedrich Karl vom Stein
 Friedrike Eleonore Juliane (12 July 1776 – 18 February 1826), who married Ludwig Friedrich Count von Kielmansegg and was the mother of 

Wallmoden's second marriage, on 3 August 1788 in Bückeburg, was to Baroness Luise Christiane von Lichtenstein (1763–1809), a daughter of Baron Friedrich Karl von Lichtenstein by his marriage to Charlotte Ernestine von Berckefeld, and with her he had three further children:
 Karl August Ludwig (4 January 1792 – 28 February 1883), an Austrian Privy Councillor and Lieutenant-General.
 Adolf Franz James Wilhelm (25 December 1794 – 3 December 1825)
 Luise Henriette (1796–1851)

See also
House of Wallmoden

Literature

 Ralf Bormann: Wallmoden’s Collections at Hanover-Herrenhausen Depicted: Towards the Reconstruction of a Baroque aemulatio of the Uffizi, in: Andrea M. Gáldy, Sylvia Heudecker, Collecting Prints and Drawings, Newcastle 2018, S. 172-189
 Ralf Bormann: Das verschleierte Bild. Zur Logik der Kopie in der Sammlung des Grafen Wallmoden (1736–1811), in: Antonia Putzger, Marion Heisterberg, Susanne Müller-Bechtel (Hg.), Nichts Neues Schaffen. Perspektiven auf die treue Kopie 1300–1900, Berlin 2018, S. 231-250
 Ralf Bormann: Die Kunstsammlung des Reichsgrafen Johann Ludwig von Wallmoden-Gimborn, in: Katja Lembke (Hg.), Als die Royals aus Hannover kamen. Hannovers Herrscher auf Englands Thron 1714–1837''. Katalog zur Niedersächsischen Landesausstellung im Landesmuseum Hannover und im Herrenhäuser Schloss vom 17. Mai bis zum 5. Oktober 2014, Dresden 2014, S. 238–261

1736 births
1811 deaths
Military personnel from Hanover
Counts of Germany
German art collectors
19th-century art collectors
Illegitimate children of George II of Great Britain
German commanders of the Napoleonic Wars